The incus (plural incudes) or anvil is a bone in the middle ear. The anvil-shaped small bone is one of three ossicles in the middle ear. The incus receives vibrations from the malleus, to which it is connected laterally, and transmits these to the stapes medially. The incus is so-called because of its resemblance to an anvil.

Structure

The incus is the second of the ossicles, three bones in the middle ear which act to transmit sound. It is shaped like an anvil, and has a long and short crus extending from the body, which articulates with the malleus. The short crus attaches to the posterior ligament of the incus. The long crus articulates with the stirrup at the lenticular process.

The superior ligament of the incus attaches at the body of the incus to the roof of the tympanic cavity.

Function

Vibrations in the middle ear are received via the tympanic membrane. The malleus, resting on the membrane, conveys vibrations to the incus. This in turn conveys vibrations to the stapes.

History
"Incus" means "anvil" in Latin. Several sources  attribute the discovery of the incus to the anatomist and philosopher Alessandro Achillini. The first brief written description of the incus was by Berengario da Carpi in his Commentaria super anatomia Mundini (1521). Andreas Vesalius, in his De humani corporis fabrica, was the first to compare the second element of the ossicles to an anvil, thereby giving it the name incus. The final part of the long limb was once described as a "fourth ossicle" by Pieter Paaw in 1615.

Additional images

See also

References

External links
 The Anatomy Wiz Incus

Bones of the head and neck
Auditory system
Ear
Ossicles